SIGL or Sigl may refer to:

The Système Intégré de Gestion de Licenses, the European Union's system for managing import licences
The locomotive company Aktien Gesellschaft der Lokomotiv-Fabrik vormals G. Sigl
Georg Sigl, an Austrian engineer
Johann Baptist Sigl, a German publicist
An alternate spelling of the name Siegel